Streptomyces halophytocola is a bacterium species from the genus of Streptomyces which has been isolatedfrom the tree Tamarix chinensis in Nantong in the Jiangsu province in China.

See also 
 List of Streptomyces species

References

Further reading

External links
Type strain of Streptomyces halophytocola at BacDive -  the Bacterial Diversity Metadatabase

halophytocola
Bacteria described in 2013